Jennie Florella Holmes (Hurd; February 26, 1842 – March 20, 1892) was an American temperance activist and suffragist.

Biography
Jennie Florella Hurd was born on February 26, 1842, on a farm in Jersey County, Illinois, where she spent her early years.

In 1859, she matriculated at Lombard College, Galesburg, Illinois, one of the few educational institutions that then offered equal opportunity to both sexes. At the beginning of the Civil War in 1861 she, like many others, cast aside their studies for the cause, teaching and, being a staunch Unionist, giving service to the Soldiers' Aid Society of Jerseyville, Illinois.

In 1866, she married Charles A. Holmes, of Jefferson, Wisconsin, who had served three years as captain in the 29th Wisconsin Infantry Regiment. With her husband and two daughters, she moved to Tecumseh, Nebraska, in September, 1871 where she had six more children.

Earnest and untiring in her advocacy of temperance and equal political rights for both sexes, she allied herself with these movements in Nebraska. In the winter of 1881, she became a member of the first woman's suffrage convention held in the state, and labored for the amendment submitted at that session of the legislature. She was chair of the executive committee of the State Suffrage Society from 1881 to 1884. In 1884, she was elected president of the Nebraska State Woman's Christian Temperance Union (W.C.T.U.), an office she held for three years. She was elected delegate-at-large from Nebraska to the National Prohibition Party Convention, held in Indianapolis in 1888. In her ardent love for the cause, she considered this the crowning honor of her life. She was active in the Woman's Relief Corps, and a delegate to the Woman's Relief Corps convention held in Milwaukee in 1889. Being attentive to educational needs in her own city as well as abroad, she was elected to the school board in 1891.

She died in her home in Tecumseh, Nebraska, March 20, 1892.

References

External links
 

1842 births
1892 deaths
Woman's Christian Temperance Union people
American temperance activists
Wikipedia articles incorporating text from A Woman of the Century
People from Jersey County, Illinois
American suffragists